The Recopa Gaúcha, is a super cup tournament organized by the Rio Grande do Sul Football Federation (FGF), disputed between the winners of Campeonato Gaúcho and Copa FGF of each season, since 2014.

List of champions

Following is the list with all the champions of the Recopa Gaúcha.

Titles by team

References

External links
 Federação Gaúcha de Futebol

Football competitions in Rio Grande do Sul